Montoso may refer to the following places:

Montoso, Maricao, Puerto Rico, a barrio
Montoso, Mayagüez, Puerto Rico, a barrio